Kim Davenport (born November 15, 1955 in McAlester, Oklahoma) is an American professional pocket billiards (pool) player, nicknamed "Kimmer".

Early days
Davenport started playing at age 10.

Professional career
He became a professional player in 1985.

Davenport is an originator of target pool.

Winner of over 60 professional tournaments, Davenport has represented the United States as a three-time member and two-time captain of the Team USA at the Mosconi Cup.

He was also a member of the International Pool Tour,

Davenport has only limited vision in his right eye, the result of a golf accident at a local driving range on November 16, 2002. The setback came during a period in which Davenport had regained a spot in the men's top 10 rankings of the United States Professional Poolplayers Association. "I've been playing well", Davenport said. "But if I never get to play pool again, I've had 17 great years. A nice sunny day that went dark."
 
Kim and wife Aida have one son and two grandchildren.

He and American champion Johnny Archer operated a pool room in Marietta, Georgia named the Marietta Billiard Club.

Davenport is a member of the BCA Hall of Fame (2018).

Career titles
 1984 Labour Day Open 9-Ball
 1985 Kentucky Open 9-Ball 
 1986 California Open 9-Ball 
 1987 Tar Heel Open 9-Ball
 1987 B.C. Open 9-Ball Pro-Am Doubles 
 1988 Capital City Mini Open 9-Ball
 1988 Japan 9-Ball Cup 
 1988 Eastern States Open 9-Ball 
 1989 Lexington All-Star Nine-ball
 1989 Greensboro Open 9-Ball
 1989 McDermott Masters 9-Ball Championship
 1990 Brunswick Swedish 9-Ball Cup
 1990 Sands Regency 9-Ball Open 
 1990 B.C. Open 9-Ball Championship 
 1990 Billiards Digest Players of the Year
 1992 Lexington All-Star Nine-ball
 1993 Tommy Billiards Open 9-Ball
 1993 Hard Times Open 9-Ball
 1993 San Francisco Classic
 1994 PBT Pro Tour Nine-Ball Championship
 1995 PBT Chalkers 9-Ball Classic
 1997 Sands Regency 9-Ball Open 
 1997 Mosconi Cup
 1998 Mosconi Cup
 1999 Mosconi Cup
 2000 U.S. Bar Table 9-Ball Championship
 2001 U.S. Bar Table 8-Ball Championship 
 2002 Sands Regency 9-Ball Open
 2018 Billiard Congress of America Hall of Fame

References

American pool players
1955 births
Living people
People from McAlester, Oklahoma
Sportspeople from Marietta, Georgia